South Thanet is a constituency in Kent represented in the House of Commons of the UK Parliament since 2015 by Craig Mackinlay, a Conservative.

Constituency profile
Tourism is an important economic activity with entertainment and beaches, particularly at Broadstairs. The constituency also includes part of the Stour Valley Walk, which passes through Sandwich on its way to Canterbury and beyond. There are picturesque villages with oast houses. The amount of fishing and coastal trade is much reduced relative to the 19th century, and is small compared to many other British ports. The seat has a higher proportion of retired people than the national average and incomes tend to be clustered around the national mean. Economic developments have included the nearby Thanet Offshore Wind Project as well as commercial, recreational and tourism activities. Farming, trades, and Port of Ramsgate provide much of the employment. Pharmaceuticals received a blow when Pfizer withdrew from the area. The unemployed claimant count, at 5.4%, was the highest of the South East's 84 constituencies at the end of 2010, and greater than the national average of 3.8%.  Since its creation in 1983 the seat has been a bellwether. In the most recent 2019 European Parliament Elections the newly formed Brexit Party won an estimated 46.73% share of the 26,295 votes cast in South Thanet.

Electoral spending criminal investigation following the 2015 general election
In 2016 an investigation by Channel 4 News revealed that the Conservative Party had spent many thousands of pounds centrally on battlebuses to transport activists, and hotel accommodation for the activists, who went to campaign in marginal constituencies, including South Thanet. The expenditure on the buses was declared by the Conservative Party on its national declaration of "Campaign Spending", but in some cases the hotel accommodation was not declared at all as election spending when it should have been. In addition, there is controversy about whether the expenditure, both on the buses and the accommodation, should have been declared on the declarations of expenditure for the constituency made by each candidate's election agent. Kent Police began an investigation into the spending returns of Craig Mackinlay following the Channel 4 report.

In a court case on 1 June 2016, brought against Mackinlay and his election agent Nathan Gray, District Judge Barron granted more time for investigation saying "In this case, the allegations are far-reaching and the consequences of a conviction would be of a local and national significance with the potential for election results being declared void."

On 14 March 2017, it was reported that Mackinlay had been interviewed under caution by officers investigating the allegations. On 2 June 2017, six days before the 2017 general election, Mackinlay and two Conservative party officials were charged by the Crown Prosecution Service with offences under the Representation of the People Act 1983. They were due to appear at Westminster Magistrates' Court on 4 July 2017.

On 9 January 2019, Mackinlay was cleared of election expenses fraud. One of the other defendants, Marion Little, was found guilty of two charges and given a nine-month suspended sentence and £5000 fine. She retained the OBE she had been awarded for political service in 2015.

Boundaries

1983–2010: The District of Thanet wards of Beacon Road, Bradstowe, Central Eastcliff, Central Westcliff, Kingsgate, Minster Parish, Newington, Northwood, Pierremont, St Lawrence, St Peter's, Sir Moses Montefiore, Southwood, and Upton, and the District of Dover wards of Ash, Little Stour, Sandwich, Woodnesborough with Staple, and Worth.

2010–present: The District of Thanet wards of Beacon Road, Bradstowe, Central Harbour, Cliffsend and Pegwell, Cliftonville East, Cliftonville West, Eastcliff, Kingsgate, Nethercourt, Newington, Northwood, St Peter's, Sir Moses Montefiore, and Viking, and the District of Dover wards of Little Stour and Ashstone, and Sandwich.

South Thanet consists of the southern and eastern part of Thanet district (the towns of Ramsgate and Broadstairs, the Cliftonville area of Margate and the village of Cliffsend) together with the northern part of Dover district, comprising the ancient Cinque Port of Sandwich and surrounding villages.

Members of Parliament

Elections

Elections in the 2010s

1: Murray appeared on the ballot paper without any description, but campaigned under the label of the Free United Kingdom Party (FUKP).

Elections in the 2000s

Elections in the 1990s

Elections in the 1980s

See also
List of parliamentary constituencies in Kent

Notes

References

Parliamentary constituencies in Kent
Thanet
Dover District
Constituencies of the Parliament of the United Kingdom established in 1983